Manos Returns is a 2018 comedy horror film, and sequel to the 1966 cult film Manos: The Hands of Fate by Harold P. Warren. Directed by Tonjia Atomic, many roles are reprised, including by Jackey Neyman Jones, Tom Neyman, and Diane Adelson.

Plot
Four friends are lost on a road trip, finding the house of a hidden cult that worships a being named Manos. They are led by the Master and his loyal servant, Torgo.

Cast
Jackey Neyman Jones as Debbie
 Diane Adelson (credited Diane Mahree Rystad) as Maggie
Tom Neyman as the master
Steven Shields as Torgo
Danielle Daggerty as Clara
Christina Pezzo as Nicki
Christopher Barnes as Jay
Nuria Aguilar as Pat
Rachel Jackson as Lenore
Bryan Jennings as Sheriff Jennings

Production
Jackey Neyman-Jones, who played Debbie in the original film, launched a Kickstarter campaign in February 2016 to make a sequel. She said it was not to be a recreation, but a "tongue-in-cheek" setting within the original storyline. She described the planned product as both funny and scary, like The Cabin in the Woods or Abbott and Costello Meet Frankenstein.

The Kickstarter goal of $24,000 was reached on February 24, 2016, and filming began. Neyman-Jones reprised her role as Debbie, her father Tom Neyman reprised his role of the Master, and Diane Mahree reprised her role as Margaret. Neyman-Jones and director Tonjia Atomic shot the film in western Oregon in mid-2016. Its world premiere screening was at Crypticon Seattle on May 4, 2018. Manos Returns entered Amazon Prime streaming in May 2020.

References

External links
 
 

2018 films
2018 comedy horror films
American comedy horror films
2010s English-language films
2010s American films